Jeffrey King Harris (born June 28, 1953) is an American aerospace executive who served as 11th director of the National Reconnaissance Office from 1994 to 1996.  Currently, he chair of the RIT Board of Trustees.

Life and career

Harris was born in White Plains, New York in 1953 and graduated from Rumson-Fair Haven Regional High School in 1971. He attended from Rochester Institute of Technology, earning an associate's degree in applied sciences in 1974 and a B.S. degree in photographic science and instrumentation in 1975. Harris then went to work for the Central Intelligence Agency. In 1978, he transferred from the National Photographic Intelligence Center to The Office of Development and Engineering.

Time at NRO

Mr. Harris managed the integration of NRO programs into three functional directorates. He was a member of the R. James Woolsey panel that studied the future of NRO systems. He was a major proponent and architect of consolidating signals intelligence systems in a new partnership with the National Security Agency. Mr. Harris directed the CORONA program declassification and established a public affairs program.

Harris and deputy director Jimmie D. Hill were dismissed in 1996 after losing track of more than $2 billion in classified money. Harris was replaced by Keith Hall.

Harris was named president of the Space Systems-Missiles & Space Operations division of Lockheed Martin in 2001.

References

External links
National Reconnaissance Office: Directors List

1953 births
Living people
People from White Plains, New York
Rumson-Fair Haven Regional High School alumni
Rochester Institute of Technology alumni
Analysts of the Central Intelligence Agency
Clinton administration personnel
Directors of the National Reconnaissance Office
Recipients of the National Intelligence Distinguished Service Medal
20th-century American businesspeople